Charles-Gaston Levadé (3 January 1869 – 27 October 1948) was a French composer.

A pupil of Jules Massenet, Grand Prix de Rome in 1863, Levadé wrote chamber music, melodies, religious music, drama and opéras comiques. He was very successful in his time.

Life 
Levadé was born in the 9th arrondissement of Paris. At the age of 13 he entered the Conservatoire de Paris where he followed the solfège classes of Albert Lavignac, Charles de Bériot, Georges Mathias, and Auguste Bazille. A few years later, it is at Lavignac's that he met Erik Satie who dedicated one of his Ogives and one of his Gymnopédies to him. 

But it is especially with Jules Massenet that Levadé reached the fullness of his talent. Among his students Massenet had an impressive number of Grand Prix de Rome. In 1911, the student paid tribute to his master by writing in the Annales politiques et littéraires dated 17 December 1911:  

After Massenet's resignation in 1896, Levadé attended the classes of Charles Lenepveu and obtained the Grand Prix de Rome in 1899 with his cantata Callirhoe to a text by Eugène Adénis.

His public debut was quite rapid. As early as 1895 he produced a Japanese pantomime: Coeur de magots, a "sketch" given at the "Grand Guignol" in 1897, and a "salon opera" in 1903. But his success really began with a three-acts opera: The Heretics, a lyrical tragedy on a poem by Ferdinand Hérold. In 1908, he composed the music for La Courtisane de Corinthe, to a text by Michel Carré and Paul Bilhaud which was staged in 1908 by Sarah Bernhardt, then Les Fiançailles de l'ami Fritz, after Erckmann-Chatrian in 1919.

Other musical adaptations of literary texts followed, such as Le Capitaine Fracasse, libretto by Émile Bergerat and Michel Carré, lyrical comedy from Théophile Gautier's eponymous novel and in 1929, La Peau de chagrin, lyrical comedy in four acts after Balzac, libretto by Pierre Decourcelle and Michel Carré, then La Rôtisserie de la reine Pédauque, lyrical comedy in four acts based on the novel by Anatole France in 1934.

Levadé was also a composer of popular songs (J'ai cueilli le lys, 1912), symphonic music (Prélude religieux for string orchestra), lullaby for piano and violin and religious music: Prélude religieux for organ, Agnus Dei for choir, Psaume CXIII for solo, choir and orchestra.

Levadé died in Cabourg on 27 October 1948.

Selected works 

 Antigone, cantata, 1893
 Clarisse Harlowe, cantata, 1895
 Cœur de Magots, japanese pantomime, 1895
 Mélusine, cantata, 1896
 Hortense, couche-toi ! by Georges Courteline, Théâtre du Grand-Guignol, 1897
 Callirhoé, cantata, 1899
 L’amour d’Héliodora, Salon Opera, 1903 
 Les Hérétiques, poem by Ferdinand Hérold,  à Béziers, libretto by Ferdinand Hérold. 1905
 Stage music for La Courtisane de Corinthe by Michel Carré and Paul Bilhaud, 1908
 Les Fiançailles de l'ami Fritz by Jean-Marc d’Anthoine, 1919
 Caroles de Noël, opera, 1923
 Sophie, opéra comique after Louis Tiercelin, Georges Docquois and Alfred Aubert, 1923
 La Peau de chagrin, lyrical comedy based on Honoré de Balzac's La Peau de chagrin by Pierre Decourcelle and Michel Carré, 1929
 Le Capitaine Fracasse, comedy by Émile Bergerat and Michel Carré based on the novel of the same name by Théophile Gautier
 Prélude religieux for string orchestre
 Danses alsaciennes for Grand Orchestra
 Feuilles d’album for Grand Orchestra
 Arrichino for piano
 Berceuse for piano and violin
 Prélude religieux for pipe organ
 Agnus Dei for Choir
 Psaume CXIII for Soli, Choir and Orchestra

References

External links 
 

1869 births
1948 deaths
Musicians from Paris
Conservatoire de Paris alumni
French classical composers
French male classical composers
Prix de Rome for composition